The following lists events that happened in 1941 in El Salvador.

Incumbents
President: Maximiliano Hernández Martínez 
Vice President: Vacant

Events

December

 8 December – El Salvador declared war on the Axis Powers in World War II following the Bombing of Pearl Harbor and joined the Allied Powers.

Undated
 España F.C., a Salvadoran football club, was disestablished.

References

 
El Salvador
1940s in El Salvador
Years of the 20th century in El Salvador
El Salvador